Basketo (also known as Basketto, Baskatta, Mesketo, Misketto, and Basketo-Dokka) is an Afro-Asiatic language spoken in the Basketo special woreda of the Southern Nations, Nationalities, and Peoples Region, which is part of Ethiopia. The speakers refer to the language as "Masketo", while their neighbors refer to it as "Basketo." It has said to consist of two dialects, "Doko" (Dokko) and "Dollo" (Dollo). Besides their mother tongue, some also speak Melo, Oyda, Galila, or Gofa.

See also
Basketo people

References

Further reading 
 Schütz, Julia (2006): "Kasusmarkierung im Basketo: Eine Analyse im Rahmen der Distribuierten Morphologie" in Gereon Müller & Jochen Trommer (eds.): Subanalysis of Argument Encoding in Distributed Morphology, Linguistische Arbeitsberichte 84, Universität Leipzig, pp. 63–75.

Languages of Ethiopia
North Omotic languages